Bridgwater railway station serves Bridgwater in Somerset, England. It is on the Bristol to Taunton Line and is operated by Great Western Railway.

Originally built to the designs of Isambard Kingdom Brunel, the station is now a Grade II* listed building.

History

The railway arrived at Bridgwater on 14 June 1841 when the Bristol and Exeter Railway opened its line. This was the terminus of the line for a year while the Somerset Bridge was constructed over the River Parrett; the line was extended to Taunton on 1 June 1842.

During the period that the station was a terminus it became a focus for horse-drawn coaches that met the trains and carried their passengers onwards. An accident happened when one of these was overturned on the level crossing that was situated at the south end of the platforms, although the only serious injury was a bystander who broke an ankle – the coach driver and passengers were largely unscathed. A hotel was built just outside the station entrance which has since been demolished, but the houses provided for the company's staff can still be seen.

The Bristol and Exeter Railway was initially operated by the Great Western Railway but from 1 May 1849 the company operated its own trains. Coke ovens, to provide fuel for the locomotives, and workshops to build and maintain the carriages and wagons, were built to the west of the line between Bridgwater station and the river – this is the nearest station to the halfway point on the line. They closed following a fire on 25 August 1947, although by this time they were only repairing wagon sheets (i.e. canvas covers).  Other local industries linked with the railway were John Browne's Brick and Tile Works, which were owned by a director of the railway and supplied materials to the Great Western and associated companies; and George Hennet's iron works (later Bridgwater Engineering Company) which made track, signals and wagons for several different companies including atmospheric railway pipes for the South Devon Railway Company.

The station was improved on several occasions, such as 1882 when new roofs and a footbridge were provided. An engine shed was provided outside the carriage works in 1893.

A new connection was provided to the west of the line half a mile north of the station on 16 June 1935 to allow access to the private siding of the British Cellophane Company siding. Initially shunted by little 0-4-0ST steam locomotives, from 1969 it was home to ex-British Rail Class 03 diesel locomotive D2133. The siding was in use for nearly 70 years but has now been disconnected.

Following the nationalisation of the railways in 1948 stations in many towns were renamed to avoid confusion, and this station became Bridgwater Central on 26 September 1949 for a few years to distinguish it from "Bridgwater North", the former Somerset and Dorset Joint Railway terminus.

The engine shed closed in July 1960, following which shunting locomotives were brought up from Taunton as required. Goods traffic at the station was withdrawn from November 1965 and, following the closure of the docks branch and Dunball Wharf in 1967, the goods yard was rationalised.  Most of the sidings that served the former carriage works at the south end of the station were taken out of use by 1969.

The station forecourt was refurbished in 2019 at a cost of £1.2m.

Description

The station buildings have survived and are kept in reasonable repair. The booking office, although modernised, retains a rare early ticket counter.

The main entrance is on the town side of the station and the platform served by trains towards Bristol.  Access to the platform for trains towards Taunton is by a footbridge.

To the north of the platforms is the goods yard on the west side of the line. The only regular goods trains to call are the Direct Rail Services trains that collect nuclear waste from Hinkley Point nuclear power station. The loading facilities for these nuclear flasks are in a secure compound on the stub of the old docks branch line. Another siding serves a warehouse but this has seen no traffic in recent years.

Services

The station and all passenger services are operated by Great Western Railway.

Docks branch

The Bristol and Exeter Railway Act had allowed for a branch to the river at Bridgwater but this was never constructed. Instead, the Corporation of Bridgwater built a tramway from the station to wharves (later known as Clink Yard) on the north side of the River Parrett; this was opened in 1845 and worked by horses. It crossed both the busy Bristol Road and Church Street on level crossings.

The railway took over the tramway in 1859 and rebuilt it for locomotive operation in 1867. In March 1871 it was extended across the river to Bridgwater Docks, which formed the entrance to the Bridgwater and Taunton Canal and was owned by the railway company. The bridge was of an unusual design that had to move to allow ships to pass upstream at high tide; first part of the bridge was rolled aside and then the remaining section was pulled clear into the space vacated by the first.

On 27 June 1954 a new connection was made from Clink Yard to the former Somerset and Dorset Joint Railway station to allow goods traffic to reach that station following the closure of that line's Bridgwater branch.

The branch was closed on 2 January 1967. The Parrett Bridge is still in position and serves as a footbridge but no longer moves. One of the last steam locomotives from the branch, ex-Cardiff Railway 0-4-0ST 1338 was taken to Bleadon and Uphill railway station for preservation but, following the closure of the museum there, has now been moved to the Didcot Railway Centre.

Somerset Bridge 

On the southern edge of Bridgwater the railway had to cross the River Parrett, which was still a navigable river in those days. Isambard Kingdom Brunel designed a brick bridge with a  span but a rise of just , this was flatter than his famous Maidenhead Railway Bridge across the River Thames.

Work started in 1838 and was completed in 1841. Brunel left the centering scaffold in place as the foundations were still settling but was forced to remove it in 1843 to reopen the river for navigation.  He demolished the brick arch and had it replaced with a timber arch within six months, without interrupting the traffic on the railway.  This was in turn replaced in 1904 by a steel girder bridge.

References 

 Station on navigable O.S. map

Railway stations in Somerset
Former Great Western Railway stations
Railway stations in Great Britain opened in 1841
Railway stations served by Great Western Railway
Grade II* listed railway stations
Grade II* listed buildings in Sedgemoor
Bridgwater
DfT Category E stations